Paul Anthony DiPietro (born September 8, 1970) is a Canadian-born Swiss former professional ice hockey player. A Stanley Cup champion with the Montreal Canadiens, he played forward and made the roster for the Swiss national ice hockey team at the 2006 Winter Olympics.

Playing career
Paul DiPietro played in the NHL for the Montreal Canadiens, Los Angeles Kings and Toronto Maple Leafs. He won a Stanley Cup with the Canadiens in 1993 and scored twice in the Cup-clinching game. On February 18, 2006 he scored the only two goals of the game in Switzerland's upset win over Canada. He played his rookie year on the Montreal Canadiens in the 1991–92 NHL season.

Career statistics

Regular season and playoffs

International

External links

Schweizerischer Eishockeyverband

1970 births
Canadian expatriate ice hockey players in Italy
Canadian expatriate ice hockey players in Germany
Canadian expatriate ice hockey players in Switzerland
Canadian emigrants to Switzerland
Cincinnati Cyclones (IHL) players
ECH Chur players
EHC Olten players
EV Zug players
Fredericton Canadiens players
HC Ambrì-Piotta players
HC Lugano players
HC Milano players
HC Sierre players
Houston Aeros (1994–2013) players
Ice hockey people from Ontario
Ice hockey players at the 2006 Winter Olympics
Kassel Huskies players
Living people
Las Vegas Thunder players
Los Angeles Kings players
Montreal Canadiens draft picks
Montreal Canadiens players
Naturalised citizens of Switzerland
Olympic ice hockey players of Switzerland
Phoenix Roadrunners (IHL) players
Sportspeople from Sault Ste. Marie, Ontario
St. John's Maple Leafs players
Stanley Cup champions
Sudbury Wolves players
Swiss people of Canadian descent
Toronto Maple Leafs players
Canadian ice hockey centres